Choi Chan-ok (born 11 February 1961) is a Korean-German taekwondo practitioner. He competed in the men's finweight at the 1988 Summer Olympics.

References

External links
 

1969 births
Sportspeople from Seoul
Living people
South Korean male taekwondo practitioners
German male taekwondo practitioners
Olympic taekwondo practitioners of Germany
Taekwondo practitioners at the 1988 Summer Olympics
World Taekwondo Championships medalists
20th-century South Korean people